2C-T (or 4-methylthio-2,5-DMPEA) is a psychedelic and hallucinogenic drug of the 2C family.  It is used by some as an entheogen. It has structural and pharmacodynamic properties similar to the drugs mescaline and 2C-T-2.

It was first synthesized and studied through a collaboration between David E. Nichols and Alexander Shulgin.

Chemistry
2C-T is in a class of compounds commonly known as phenethylamines, and is the 4-methylthio analogue of 2C-O, a positional isomer of mescaline.  It is also the 2C analog of Aleph.  The systematic name of the chemical is 2-(2,5-dimethoxy-4-(methylthio)phenyl)ethanamine. The CAS number of 2C-T is 61638-09-3.

Effects
2C-T's active dosage is around 75–150 mg and produces mescaline and MDMA-like effects that may last up to 6 hours.

Pharmacology
The mechanism that produces 2C-T’s hallucinogenic and entheogenic effects has not been specifically established, however it is most likely to result from action as a 5-HT2A serotonin receptor agonist in the brain, a mechanism of action shared by all of the hallucinogenic tryptamines and phenethylamines for which the mechanism of action is known.

Popularity
2C-T is almost unknown on the black market although it has rarely been sold by "research chemical" companies.  Limited accounts of 2C-T can be found in the book PiHKAL.

Legality

Canada
As of October 31, 2016; 2C-T is a controlled substance (Schedule III) in Canada.

United States
2C-T is unscheduled and unregulated in the United States; however its close similarity in structure and effects to 2C-T-7 could potentially subject possession and sale of 2C-T to prosecution under the Federal Analog Act. This seems to be the tack the federal government is taking in the wake of the DEA's Operation Web Tryp. A series of court cases in the US involving the prosecution of several online vendors were commenced in 2004 and resulted in a number of convictions.

See also
 2C-T-2
 2C-T-3
 2C-T-4
 2C-T-7
 2C-T-16
 Mescaline

References

2C (psychedelics)
Thioethers